Jean or Jeannie Robertson may refer to:

People
 Jean Robertson (author) (Jean Bromley, 1913–1990), British scholar of English renaissance literature
Jean Robertson (actress) (c.1894–1967), Australian stage and screen actress
 Jean Robertson Burnet (1920–2009), Canadian academic's maiden name
 Jean McKenzie (Jean Robertson McKenzie, 1901–1964), New Zealand diplomat
 Jean Forbes-Robertson (1905–1962), British actress
 Jeannie Robertson (1908–1975), Scottish folk singer

Characters
 Jean Robertson-Holley (née Jean Robertson), a fictional character from Unclaimed
 Jean Robertson, a character and teratology of novels from Jane Duncan

See also 
 John Robertson (disambiguation) ("Jean" is French for "John")
 Jen Robertson (disambiguation)
 Robertson (surname)